Dusty Notes is the fifteenth studio album by American rock band Meat Puppets. The album was released on March 8, 2019, by Megaforce Records. It is the Meat Puppets' first album to feature Elmo Kirkwood, son of the Puppets' lyricist and guitar player Curt Kirkwood; Elmo plays backing guitar.  It is also the MP's first album to feature keyboardist Ron Stabinsky. Dusty Notes also notably features the return of original drummer Derrick Bostrom.

Content

Musical style 
Dusty Notes has been described by MXDWN as incorporating "alt-rock, psychedelic and country rock" aspects.

Critical reception

Dusty Notes was met with some positive reception. AllMusic's Mark Deming remarked that the album "the best qualities of their more mature work", proclaiming it "a pleasing and well-crafted set" that reminds listeners that the band are "still vital and productive".

Caitlin Wills of MXDWN opined that the record's collection of songs were "as unique as they are beautiful".

Track listing

Chart

Personnel
Curt Kirkwood – vocals, guitars, arrangements
Cris Kirkwood – vocals, bass guitar
Elmo Kirkwood – guitar
Ron Stabinsky – keyboards
Derrick Bostrom – drums, percussion

References

2019 albums
Meat Puppets albums
Megaforce Records albums